Lincoln Alexander Williams (born 6 October 1993) is an Australian male volleyball player who is currently playing for Incheon Korean Air Jumbos in the Korean V-League.

Club career
At club level Williams has played for the AIS (Australian Institute of Sport senior team starting at age 16 in 2010 to 2012) in the Australian Volleyball League - winning MVP and the Best Spiker award two seasons that he played. After the 2012 Olympics he has played for European clubs Linköpings VC in Sweden, Volley Corigliano in Italy, Selver Tallinn in Estonia, United Volleys Frankfurt of the Deutsche Volleyball-Bundesliga, MKS Będzin of the Polish PlusLiga, Yugra-Samotlor in Nizhnevartovsk of the Russian Super League and AS Cannes Volley-Ball of the French League. 

He currently plays for Incheon Korean Air Jumbos in the Korean V-League.

Australian national team
Williams was a member of the Australia men's national volleyball team at age 18 and competed at the 2012 Summer Olympics. Williams has represented Australia in a number of matches in Volleyball World League of 2014, 2015 and 2017.  He also competed in the 2018 FIVB Men's World Championships and the FIVB Volleyball Nations League Championships setting a new record for most aces in a single match (6) against Russia on 1 June 2018 in the VNL.

Sporting achievements

Clubs
Baltic League
  2014/2015 - with Selver Tallinn

National championship
 2011/2012  Australian Championship, with AIS
 2012/2013  Swedish Championship, with Linköpings VC
 2015/2016  Estonian Championship, with Selver Tallinn
 2016/2017  Estonian Championship, with Selver Tallinn
 2017/2018  German Championship, with United Volleys Frankfurt
 2020/2021  French Championship, with AS Cannes Volley-Ball

National cup
 2016/2017  Estonian Cup 2016, with Selver Tallinn

National team
 2019  AVC Asian Championship

Individual
 2011 Australian League Most Valuable Player
 2011 Australian League Best Spiker
 2012 Australian League Most Valuable Player
 2012 Australian League Best Spiker
 2015 Baltic League – Best Scorer
 2021 French League Most Valuable Player

References

External links
 profile at FIVB.org

Australian men's volleyball players
Volleyball players at the 2012 Summer Olympics
Olympic volleyball players of Australia
1993 births
Living people
Expatriate volleyball players in Estonia
Expatriate volleyball players in Germany
Expatriate sportspeople in Sweden
Expatriate volleyball players in Poland
Expatriate volleyball players in Russia
Expatriate volleyball players in Italy